Jordan Branch is a stream in the U.S. state of Missouri. It is a tributary of Bee Creek.

Jordan Branch took its name from a nearby Baptist church of the same name.

References

Rivers of Buchanan County, Missouri
Rivers of Platte County, Missouri
Rivers of Missouri